Michiel Hemmen (born 28 June 1987) is a retired Dutch footballer who played as a forward. He formerly played for FC Volendam, AGOVV Apeldoorn, BV Veendam, Westerlo, SC Cambuur, BK Häcken, Excelsior and Altona Magic.

Career 
Hemmen made his debut for SC Cambuur on 12 August 2012, on which occasion he scored a goal in the 1st minute. In the 2012-2013 season Hemmen scored 17 goals, with which he made a substantial contribution to the team's championship and promotion to the Dutch Eredivisie. In 2013 Hemmen signed a contract extension with SC Cambuur, that will keep him in Leeuwarden until the summer of 2015.

Hemmen signed for FC Lienden on 23 September 2018. On 10 February 2019, Hemmen moved to Australian club Altona Magic SC for the 2019 season, the club announced on Facebook.

In June 2020, Hemmen returned to the Netherlands where he signed with Tweede Divisie club Rijnsburgse Boys. After only two appearances for the club, he left in February 2021 to return to his childhood club KFC.

Honours

Club
Cambuur
Eerste Divisie (1): 2012–13

References

External links
 Voetbal International profile 
 

1987 births
Living people
Dutch footballers
FC Volendam players
SC Veendam players
AGOVV Apeldoorn players
SC Cambuur players
BK Häcken players
Excelsior Rotterdam players
K.V.C. Westerlo players
FC Emmen players
FC Lienden players
Belgian Pro League players
Eredivisie players
Eerste Divisie players
Allsvenskan players
Footballers from Zaanstad
Association football forwards
Expatriate footballers in Sweden
Expatriate footballers in Belgium
Expatriate soccer players in Australia
Rijnsburgse Boys players
Tweede Divisie players